Jonathan Ifunga Ifasso (born 10 March 1999) is a Congolese professional footballer who plays as a midfielder for DHJ. He represents the DR Congo national team.

Career
Ifasso began his senior career with Dauphins Noirs and Nyuki in his native Congo. He transferred to DHJ in Morocco in 2019.

International career
Ifasso debuted with the DR Congo national team in a 3–0 friendly loss to Burkina Faso on 9 October 2020.

References

External links

1999 births
Living people
Footballers from Kinshasa
Democratic Republic of the Congo footballers
Democratic Republic of the Congo international footballers
Association football midfielders
Difaâ Hassani El Jadidi players
Linafoot players
Botola players
Democratic Republic of the Congo expatriate footballers
Democratic Republic of the Congo expatriate sportspeople in Morocco
Expatriate footballers in Morocco
21st-century Democratic Republic of the Congo people